Robert Barlow Hall (October 13, 1899 – September 8, 1987) was an American ice hockey player who played eight games in the National Hockey League with the New York Americans during the 1925–26 season. The rest of his career, which lasted from 1922 to 1926, was mainly spent in the United States Amateur Hockey Association. Born in Oak Park, Illinois but he grew up in Duluth, Minnesota.

Career statistics

Regular season and playoffs

References

External links
 

1899 births
1987 deaths
American men's ice hockey forwards
Boston Athletic Association ice hockey players
Dartmouth Big Green men's ice hockey players
Ice hockey people from Duluth, Minnesota
New York Americans players